Godagari is an Upazila of Rajshahi District in the Division of Rajshahi, Bangladesh. This is the place where Mahananda river fall to Padma or Ganges.

Geography
It has 40011 households and total area 472.13 km2.

Godagari Upazila is bounded by  Chapai Nawabganj Sadar Upazila of Chapai Nawabganj district and Tanore Upazila on the north, Tanore and Paba Upazilas on the east, Lalgola, Bhagawangola I and Bhagawangola II CD Blocks, in Murshidabad district, West Bengal, India, all across the Ganges/ Padma, on the south, and Chapai Nawabganj Sadar Upazila on the west.

Demographics
According to 2011 Bangladesh census, Godagari had a population of 330,924. Males constituted 50.24% of the population and females 49.76%. Muslims formed 87.78% of the population, Hindus 7.14%, Christians 3.41% and others 1.68%. Godagari had a literacy rate of 46.34% for the population 7 years and above.

As of the 1991 Bangladesh census, Godagari has a population of 217811. Males constitute 50.88% of the population, and females 49.12%. This Upazila's eighteen up population is 108869. Godagari has an average literacy rate of 27.6% (7+ years), and the national average of 32.4% literate.

History
The Deopara Prashasti, an important inscription in Sanskrit poetry describing the Sena dynasty of ancient Bengal, was discovered near the village of Deopara.

Points of interest
Padumsa Dighi (pond) of Raja Bijoy Sen at village Deopara (eleventh century), tomb of Shah Sultan at Sultanganj (fourteenth century), tomb of Ali Kuli Beg at Kumarpur,

Marks of War of Liberation Memorial monument 1 (Sheikherpara).

Administration
Godagari thana was established in 1865 and was turned into an upazila in 1984.

Godagari Upazila is divided into Godagari Municipality, Kakanhat Municipality, and nine union parishads: Basudebpur, Char Ashariadaha, Deopara, Godagari, Gogram, Matikata, Mohanpur, Pakri, and Rishikul. The union parishads are subdivided into 389 mauzas and 398 villages.

Education

According to Banglapedia, Godagari School & College, founded in 1905, is a notable secondary school.

References

Upazilas of Rajshahi District